Daniel Karbassiyoon (born August 10, 1984) is an American former professional soccer player who played for English sides Arsenal, Ipswich Town and Burnley. He is currently working as a scout and IT Product Owner for Arsenal in London.

Early life
Karbassiyoon was born in Roanoke, Virginia to an Italian mother and Iranian father. He holds dual American and Italian citizenship.

Club career
He signed a full contract with Arsenal in 2003, moving from amateur club Roanoke Star at the beginning of the previous season. Having joined as a forward, he adapted his role to that of a left back.

Karbassiyoon's first match for Arsenal was against Manchester City in the League Cup on October 27, 2004, as a substitute for Arturo Lupoli. He marked his debut by scoring a goal in the 90th minute; the match finished 2–1. He then went on to secure a starting spot in the League Cup's next round match against Everton at Highbury where a young Arsenal side prevailed 3-1. His final match with the first team saw him play the final ten minutes of a 1-0 defeat against Manchester United at Old Trafford. However, he could not gain any sort of place in the regular Arsenal first team and, in November 2004, he was loaned out to Football League Championship team Ipswich Town for three months, making six appearances for the East Anglian side.

Arsenal released Karbassiyoon in the summer of 2005, after he had played just three times for them, all in the League Cup. He signed for Burnley soon afterwards.  However, a series of injuries left Karbassiyoon unable to establish himself at Turf Moor and he was placed on the transfer list at the end of his first season at the club.  His contract was terminated by mutual consent in August 2006.

Karbassiyoon had a trial at Dutch team AZ Alkmaar, but wasn't offered a contract. Owing to knee injury problems, he retired from professional football in February 2007, at the age of 22.

As of April 4, 2007, he is employed by Arsenal as scout for North America. He has been credited for scouting Costa Rican international Joel Campbell as well as German-born Gedion Zelalem.

Karbassiyoon published an e-book, The Arsenal Yankee, which detailed his journey from player to scout in 2016.

Career statistics

References

External links

 Danny Karbassiyoon on Twitter.
 Danny Karbassiyoon interview.

1984 births
Living people
Sportspeople from Roanoke, Virginia
Soccer players from Virginia
American soccer players
American expatriate soccer players
United States men's youth international soccer players
Association football defenders
Arsenal F.C. players
Burnley F.C. players
Ipswich Town F.C. players
English Football League players
Arsenal F.C. non-playing staff
American people of Iranian descent
American people of Italian descent
Italian people of Iranian descent
Sportspeople of Iranian descent
Association football scouts